General Admission is the second studio album by American rapper Machine Gun Kelly. It was released on October 16, 2015, by his indie record label EST 19XX, distributed by Bad Boy and Interscope Records. The album was supported by two singles: "Till I Die" and "A Little More" featuring Victoria Monet.

Promotion
In preparation for the official release of General Admission, MGK released a 10-track mixtape, titled Fuck It, on July 23, 2015. MGK had reportedly released the mixtape out of frustration, following Bad Boy delaying the release of General Admission several times. The mixtape is compiled of songs that were left off of General Admission, and was released to his fans as an apology for the delays. MGK released the album artwork and revealed the release date on September 11, 2015, via Instagram. Many fans took it upon themselves to spray paint the album title around their hometowns to show their support and loyalty to MGK's EST movement.

Singles
The album's lead single, called "Till I Die" was released on January 5, 2015 via YouTube, through MGK's Vevo account. The song was produced by MGK, alongside Casey McPerry and the production team J.U.S.T.I.C.E. League. The song charted at number 32 on the Billboard Hot R&B/Hip-Hop Songs charts. In June 2015, MGK released the single's sequel through WorldStarHipHop, featuring guest appearances from the Cleveland-based hip hop group Bone Thugs-n-Harmony, fellow rapper and Bad Boy artist French Montana, and rappers Yo Gotti and Real Kid, along with the accompanying music video.

The album's second single, called "A Little More" was released on March 30, 2015, through the same channels, with the accompanying music video releasing on May 18, 2015. The song features a guest appearance by American singer-songwriter Victoria Monet, with production provided by Tommy Brown. "A Little More" charted on the two respective charts, performing marginally worse at 108 and 35 respectively; however, the song did chart at number 81 on the Canadian Hot 100.

Other songs
The tracks "World Series" and "Gone", featuring Leroy Sanchez, were released via the same channels as their predecessors. However, these tracks did not chart due to the singles being album specifics, and were released with the intention to promote the album, as both were released a few weeks prior to the album.

Reception

Chris Mench of XXL found the album a step up from his debut effort, saying that, "General Admission has its low moments — the series of emotional, down-tempo songs is a bit repetitive by the end — but it feels much more cohesive than his last effort." David Jeffries of AllMusic stated that "General Admission can be corrosive and coarse like Nirvana's In Utero, but while it lacks that album's artistic weight, it's proud to be unattractive which, oddly enough, becomes this druggy downer's allure." Marcus Dowling of HipHopDX called it "a mixed-bag of an album that aims high and falls short, but an amazing story is told along the way." Conversely, Jacob Sigmon of WPGU said "the lyrics, production value, and overall message is sloppy and very painful to listen to."

Commercial performance
General Admission debuted at number 4 on the Billboard 200, powered by first week sales of 56,000 equivalent album units; it sold 49,000 copies in its first week, with the remainder of its unit total reflecting the album's streaming activity and track sales. The album also debuted at number one on the Billboard Top R&B/Hip-Hop Albums.

Track listing

Charts

Weekly charts

Year-end charts

Certifications

See also
 List of Billboard number-one R&B/Hip-Hop albums of 2015

References

External links

2015 albums
Bad Boy Records albums
Interscope Records albums
Machine Gun Kelly (musician) albums
Albums produced by J.U.S.T.I.C.E. League
Albums produced by Jennifer Decilveo